was the lead ship of the  protected cruisers of the Imperial Japanese Navy. Niitaka was named after Mount Niitaka in Taiwan, at the time, the tallest mountain in the Japanese Empire.

Background
The Niitaka-class cruisers were ordered by the Imperial Japanese Navy under its 2nd Emergency Expansion Program, with a budget partly funded by the war indemnity received from the Empire of China as part of the settlement of the Treaty of Shimonoseki ending the First Sino-Japanese War. The class was intended for high speed reconnaissance missions. Niitaka was built at the Yokosuka Naval Arsenal, with the keel laid down on 7 January 1902 and launching on 15 November 1902.

Design
In terms of design, Niitaka was very conservative in layout and similar to, but somewhat larger than the earlier Japanese-designed . The increased displacement, heavier armor and lower center of gravity resulted in a more seaworthy and powerful vessel than Suma, and enabled Niitaka to outclass many other contemporary protected cruisers.

In terms of armament, it is noteworthy that Niitaka was not equipped with torpedoes. Observing problems experienced by the United States Navy during the Spanish–American War with torpedo reliability and the dangers of sympathetic detonation, it was decided not to use this weapon on the new cruisers. The main battery used the standard /40 naval gun found on most contemporary Japanese cruisers.

The Niitaka-class cruisers were fitted with 16 Niclausse boilers, a great improvement on the locomotive boilers of the Suma class.

Service life

Russo-Japanese War
Niitaka was commissioned just in time for the Russo-Japanese War and saw combat at the Battle of Chemulpo Bay on 2 February 1904 against the Russian cruiser . She subsequently participated in the shore bombardment of Russian positions during the Battle of Port Arthur on 9 March 1904. From April, Niitaka was assigned to patrols of the Korea Strait and the Sea of Japan, but was not in position to participate in Battle off Ulsan on 14 August 1904. She did, however, assist in the rescue of Russian sailors off the sinking cruiser  after the battle. At the Battle of the Yellow Sea, Niitaka was part of the 4th Detachment of Japanese 2nd Fleet against the Russian cruiser .She was subsequently one of the ships stationed at Makung in the Pescadores Islands to watch for the arrival of the Russian Baltic Fleet.

Niitaka took one hit during the engagement, which killed one crewman and wounded three others. On 28 May 1905, Niitaka and  intercepted and sank the cruiser  which had been heavily damaged the day before and which was attempting to escape towards Korea together with a destroyer.

On 28 May 1905, Niitaka took part in the final combat of the battle against cruiser . For the remainder of the war, Niitaka ferried troop convoys in the Sea of Japan, and was overhauled at the Sasebo Naval Arsenal in September 1905.

After the war, Niitaka was assigned to patrol duties off the China coast, and was occasionally stationed at Manila to protect Japanese citizens and economic interests in the Philippines.

In October, Niitaka was assigned to detached duty, to provide escort for the passenger liner , which carried on board Prince Karl Anton of Hohenzollern.

World War I

In World War I, Niitaka participated in the Battle of Tsingtao, and was later assigned to the Japanese 3rd Fleet based at Singapore, to protect British shipping around Australia and New Zealand from German commerce raiders, as part of Japan's contribution to the Allied war effort under the Anglo-Japanese Alliance. While at Singapore, 158 marines from the cruisers  and Niitaka helped suppress the February 1915 Singapore Mutiny by Indian Sepoy troops against the British.

From mid-1915 to 1918, Tsushima and Niitaka were permanently based at Cape Town, assisting the Royal Navy in patrolling the sea lanes in the Indian Ocean, linking Europe to the east against German commerce raiders and U-boats.

Post-war career
From September to July 1920, Niitaka assisted in the landings of Japanese forces in Petropavlovsk under the Siberian Intervention to help the White Russian forces against the Bolsheviks in the Russian Civil War, and to protect Japanese fishermen along the Kamchatka Peninsula.

Niitaka was assigned to patrols of the coasts of southern China and the northern edges of the Netherlands East Indies in the South China Sea from May–September 1921, and on 1 September 1921, was re-designated a 2nd class coastal defense vessel.

Fate
On 26 August 1922, Niitaka anchored near the mouth of a river in what is now part of the Ust-Bolsheretsky District on the southern coast of the Kamchatka Peninsula, while a party of 15 led by Lieutenant Shigetada Gunji went ashore. The only survivors were the members of the shore party. A Russian source states that the captain survived the accident, only to commit seppuku afterwards.

A salvage team sent in 1923 determined the wreck to be unsalvageable, and destroyed the remains with explosives. A concrete obelisk was also erected with a portion of the ship's mast on a hill slightly north of the wreck site. Niitaka was formally written off the navy list on 1 April 1924.

Notes

References

External links

Niitaka-class cruisers
Ships built by Yokosuka Naval Arsenal
1902 ships
Russo-Japanese War cruisers of Japan
World War I cruisers of Japan
Maritime incidents in 1922
Shipwrecks in the Sea of Okhotsk